The history of the Igbo people starts from the migrations that have brought the Igbo to their present homeland.

Prehistory
{| class="wikitable" style="width:100%;"
|-
! style="width:6%" | Period || Event
|-
| c. 3000 BC || Neolithic man's existence in Igboland.<ref name="Ogbaa">Understanding 'Things Fall Apart''' by Kalu Ogbaa</ref>
|-
| c. AD 850 ||  Bronzes found at the town of Igbo-Ukwu are created, among them iron swords, bronze and copper vases and ornaments and terracotta sculptures are made.
|}

Early history

Modern history

References

Further reading
 Understanding 'Things Fall Apart''' by Kalu Ogbaa 

 
Igbo